Giszowiec (German: Gieschewald) is an eastern district of the city of Katowice (Silesian Voivodeship, Poland), created as a coal miners' settlement in 1907. Initially consisting of about 3,300 miners and their families, the district's population have grown over the years to over 18,000. Although Giszowiec's architectural originality suffered major damages in the 1970s and 1980s due to large scale urbanization, its early unique character can be still felt in the surviving miners' housings, the marketplace, numerous individual buildings and structures, as well as the relatively well preserved general design of a "Garden city".

Location
Giszowiec is located some 7 kilometers southeast from the center of Katowice and its geographical coordinates are 50° 14' N, 19° 04' O coordinates: 50° 14' N, 19° 04' O. Its boundaries are marked in the north by the motorway A4, in the west by the international European route E75, while in the south and in the east, Giszowiec borders the nearby city of Mysłowice. The settlement is somewhat isolated from other Katowice districts and is surrounded by green areas and forests. The neighboring districts are Murcki (3 kilometers to the southwest), as well as Janów and Nikiszowiec in the north.

History

Beginnings
The settlement of Giszowiec does not have a long history. The company "Georg von Giesches Erben", which in late 19th century owned many mines in Upper Silesia, planned its own settlement for workers, and therefore Colonie Gieschewald was founded 1907.

Structure of the colony
The leading director of the settlement was Anton Uthemann, who came up with the basic project. This work was completed by George and Emil Zillmann, architects from Charlottenburg, who designed the settlement inspired by Ebenezer Howard's idea of the "Garden city". In just three years the project was completed: high living standard houses for 600 families were built, with four main streets leading to the central marketplace (today called Plac pod Lipami - Square under the Linden Trees). The settlement had its own institutions, a hotel, department stores, a swimming pool and a water tower. Some dwellings were offered to those miners who lived without family. Most inhabitants worked for the Giesche coal mine (today: Wieczorek coal mine), and the total cost of the colony was estimated at 5 million German Marks. In 1914, a narrow-gauge railway to Janów was opened. Throughout its early history the colony was an independent municipality.

Silesian Uprisings
Inhabitants of the settlement took active part in the Silesian Uprisings, and during the Plebiscite in Upper Silesia, over 70% locals voted for Poland.

Giszowiec in Poland
On 20 June 1922 Gieschewald was renamed Giszowiec and became part of the new Autonomous Silesian Voivodeship and was since then part of the Second Polish Republic. In the subsequent years, numerous Polish associations, among them also a choir were created. Giszowiec lost its independent status in 1924, when it was incorporated into the new municipality of Janów.

German troops occupied the settlement on 4 September 1939. During the occupation, the Nazis tried to destroy everything related to Poland, including a monument of the Silesian Uprising. On 27 January 1945, Red Army captured Giszowiec.

After the Second World War, Giszowiec was merged with Szopienice, but later this decision was voided.

In the course of time the appearance of the colony changed. 1964 were established in the area of the colony after hard coal finds the Staszic Steinkohlebergwerk. In order to take up the inflow of new workers, new populated areas were proven. It was decided that the colony should be torn off and be established in the area a new settlement with zehnstoeckigen blocks of flats. Thus 1969 the Stanisław Staszic housing development was built, which approximated in the next decades ever more near to the old colony. In the western part and East part new disk's buildings replaced the old brick houses, and the colony began to lose their old character of a company-owned housing estate. With the resolutions of the responsible curator of 1978 and 1987 to place the old land development under monument protection the colony could be saved fortunately. In the nineties was begun to maintain and also restore the historical settlement. Nevertheless, only one third of the old land development remained. 1984 were begun with the building of the Barbarapfarrkirche in the Staszic settlement.

Giszowiec is also today still surrounded by forest and is by its relatively large distance to the urban tightness, a popular local recreation place for the inhabitants of the whole city and, since it is the only garden city in Poland, gladly visited and also inhabited. The houses of the colony were transferred 1999 of the city Katowice, since the houses become sold at private people.

Education
In the old colony there is an elementary school number 51(Szkoła Podstawowa nr 51) with approximately 1000 pupils. School building was constructed in 1993 and is the newest in Giszowiec. The two high schools are older. In the seventies the Konopnicka High School (Gimnazjum numer 16 imienia Marii Konopnickiej) was established, the school chronicles go back however until 1908, thus the beginnings of the Gieschewalder school history. Here there are 400 pupils. In addition there exists another high school (Gimnazjum nr 15), with 374 pupils.

Worth seeing
 Colony Gieschewald with received allocation of road and work houses (1907–1910)
 Water tower from the time of origin of the colony
 Forest areas in the environment

Literature
 H.von Reuffurth, Gieschewald ein neues oberschlesisches Bergarbeiterdorf der Bergwerksgesellschaft, Kattowitz 1910
 Lech Szaraniec: Osady i Osiedla Katowic. Katowice 1996 (book concerning the city Kattowitz and their quarters with German summary)
 Leszek Jabłołski, Maria Kaźmierczak: Na trasie Ekspresu Giszowiec Nikiszowiec Szopienice. Przewodnik po dzielnicach Katowic. CRUX, Katowice o.J.,  (leaders by the quarters Giszowiec, Nikiszowiec and Szopienice with English summary)

External links
Unofficial site about Giszowiec

Districts of Katowice